Events from the year 1981 in Croatia.

Incumbents

Events

Arts and literature

Sport

Births
January 14 – Jadranka Đokić, actress.
January 28 – Marko Babić, footballer.
February 26 – Tomislav Dujmović, footballer.
March 29 – Dolores Lambaša, actress.
April 14 – Jacques Houdek, singer.
July 6 – Jelena Kostanić Tošić, tennis player.
September 8 – Žanamari Lalić, singer and winner of Hrvatski Idol (season 1)
November 27 – Nataša Janjić, actress.
December 2 – Danijel Pranjić, footballer.
December 4 – Matija Kvasina, cyclist.
December 18 – Nives Celsius, singer and writer.

Deaths
September 2 – Andrija Maurović, comic book author (born 1901).
December 29 – Miroslav Krleža, writer (born 1893).
December 30 – Franjo Šeper, Cardinal (born 1905).

References

 
Years of the 20th century in Croatia
Croatia